The Valley of Ghosts is a 1928 British silent mystery film directed by G. B. Samuelson and starring Miriam Seegar, Ian Hunter and Leo Sheffield. It was an adaptation of the 1922 novel The Valley of Ghosts by Edgar Wallace. It was made at Beaconsfield Studios. It is currently a lost film.

Cast
 Miriam Seegar - Stella Nelson 
 Ian Hunter - Andrew McLeod 
 Leo Sheffield - Kenneth Nelson 
 Wallace Bosco - Derricus Merrivan 
 Derrick De Marney - Arthur Wilmot 
 George Bellamy  -Sleepwalker

References

Bibliography
 Low, Rachael. History of the British Film: Filmmaking in 1930s Britain. George Allen & Unwin, 1985 .

External links

1928 films
British crime films
1928 crime films
British silent feature films
Films directed by G. B. Samuelson
Films based on British novels
Films based on works by Edgar Wallace
Films shot at Beaconsfield Studios
Lost British films
British black-and-white films
1928 mystery films
British mystery films
1928 lost films
Lost crime films
Lost mystery films
1920s English-language films
1920s British films
Silent mystery films